Paul Eugene Howard (September 12, 1950 – December 5, 2020) was an American football player who played guard in the National Football League (NFL) for the Denver Broncos. Howard graduated from Central Valley High School and played college football at BYU.

External links
NFL.com player page

1950 births
2020 deaths
Players of American football from San Jose, California
American football offensive guards
BYU Cougars football players
Denver Broncos players